Michael Riegels  (pronounced ) was the inaugural chairman of the Financial Services Commission of the British Virgin Islands. He is a qualified barrister and was formerly the senior partner of Harneys from 1984 to 1997, and he also served the president of the BVI Bar Association from 1996 to 1998 and as president of the British Virgin Islands branch of the Red Cross.

Career 

Riegels was also part of the "gang of five" who drafted the original International Business Companies Act in 1984, the principal statute of the BVI's offshore finance industry for many years (and subsequently copied by a large number of competing offshore jurisdictions).

In 1999, he was appointed by the Government as chairman of a public inquiry in relation to the escape of certain Colombian prisoners who were on remand awaiting trial for charges relating to drug trafficking.

Background 

He was born in Tanga, Tanganyika (later part of Tanzania) in 1938 and educated at Prince of Wales School in Nairobi, Kenya and Oxford University where he won a full blue for athletics. He was admitted to the Bar of England and Wales in 1961 as a member of Gray's Inn, and to the Bar of the British Virgin Islands in 1973.  He was one of the founding members of the BVI Bar Association in 1977.

Footnotes

External links 

 Video: The Story of the IBC Act (featuring Michael Riegels)
 BVI Financial Services Commission
 BVI Red Cross
 BVI Bar Association
 Harneys

Alumni of Pembroke College, Oxford
20th-century British Virgin Islands lawyers
1938 births
Living people
Alumni of Nairobi School
British Virgin Islands Queen's Counsel
People from Tanga, Tanzania
People from Tanga Region